The 1935 Rutgers Queensmen football team represented Rutgers University in the 1935 college football season. In their fifth season under head coach J. Wilder Tasker, the Queensmen compiled a 4–5 record, won the Middle Three Conference championship, and were outscored by their opponents 170 to 115.

Schedule

References

Rutgers
Rutgers Scarlet Knights football seasons
Rutgers Queensmen football